Matinee Theater is an American anthology series that aired on NBC during the Golden Age of Television, from October 31, 1955, to June 27, 1958. Its name is often seen as Matinee Theatre.

The series, which ran daily from 3 p.m. to 4 p.m. Eastern Time, was usually broadcast live and most of the time in color.  Its live dramas were presented with minimal sets and costumes. It was the first daily hour-long dramatic series on television.

When it was broadcast, Matinee Theater was the most heavily promoted regularly scheduled daytime program on U.S. television. Along with NBC's Home, the show was part of the network's effort to "provide quality 'adult' entertainment" in daytime programming.

In its second season, the program had an audience of 7 million daily viewers.

The series ended in 1958 due to its high budget; much higher than any other daytime program in television. In 1956, the program's budget was "about $73,000" to produce five episodes per week. A few of the later episodes were preserved on color film for later rerun syndication under different titles. The scripts of the series' episodes are archived at the University of California, Los Angeles. Several episodes are preserved at the UCLA Film & Television Archive, The Paley Center, and the Library of Congress.


Buckley's comments 
Jim Buckley of the Pewter Plough Playhouse (Cambria, California) recalled:
When Al McCleery got back to the States, he originated a most ambitious theatrical TV series for NBC called Matinee Theater: to televise five different stage plays per week. This series aired live at 3 p.m. Eastern time and 12 noon Pacific, in order to promote color TV (which had just been developed) to the American housewife as she labored over her ironing. Al [McCleery] was the producer. He hired five directors and five art directors. Richard Bennett, one of our first early presidents of the Pewter Plough Corporation, was one of the directors and I was one of the art directors and, as soon as we were through televising one play, we had lunch and then met to plan next week’s show. That was over 50 years ago, and I’m trying to think; I believe the TV art director is (or was) his own set decorator (selecting furnishings and hand props)—yes, of course! It had to be, since one of McCleery’s chief claims to favor with the producers was his elimination of the setting per se and simply decorating the scene with a minimum of props. It took a bit of ingenuity.

Personnel and production 
Directors included Walter Grauman, Boris Sagal, Lamont Johnson, Arthur Hiller, Lawrence Schwab, Allen A. Buckhantz, Alan Cooke, and Livia Granito. The show initially had 16 directors, but McCleery released those who could not promptly answer questions about what they needed or wanted for episodes.

A staff of about a dozen people searched through books, magazines, and material in the public domain, looking for ideas, and about the same number of writers produced material for the program.

While one episode of the program was being broadcast, the next day's episode was in final rehearsal. Both occurred in the same studio, with a soundproof curtain separating the activities. Two crews of 75 technicians each worked on the projects. Meanwhile, four future episodes were being rehearsed in four rehearsal halls in a facility at the corner of Vine and Selma in Los Angeles.

Notable guest stars

Anna Maria Alberghetti
Steve Allen
Mary Astor
Jim Backus
Patricia Barry
Jacques Bergerac
Richard Boone
Laurie Carroll
Leo G. Carroll
Chuck Connors
Richard Crenna
Jane Darwell
Bradford Dillman
Joanne Dru
Shelley Fabares
Frances Farmer
Nina Foch
Eva Gabor
Edmund Gwenn
June Havoc
Wendy Hiller
Dennis Hopper
Edward Everett Horton
Vivi Janiss
David Janssen
Cecil Kellaway
DeForest Kelley
Shirley Knight
Michael Landon
Cloris Leachman
Anita Louise
Roddy McDowall
Darren McGavin
Martin Milner
Agnes Moorehead
Rita Moreno
Jack Nicholson
Hugh O'Brian
Margaret O'Brien
Arthur O'Connell
Maureen O'Sullivan
Susan Oliver
Geraldine Page
Suzanne Pleshette
Mala Powers
Barbara Rush
George Peppard
Vincent Price
Cesar Romero
Marian Seldes
Pat Sheehan
Wim Sonneveld
Dean Stockwell
Phyllis Thaxter
Marshall Thompson
Rudy Vallee
Ethel Waters
James Whitmore
Mary Wickes
Fay Wray
Alan Young

Award nominations

Notable episodes 

The program's initial presentation was "Beginning Now", by John P. Marquand, starring Louis Hayward.

Episodes

Season 1 (1955-56)

Season 2 (1956-57)

Season 3 (1957-58)

References

Notes

External links 
 
 Matinee Theatre at CVTA with episode list

1955 American television series debuts
1958 American television series endings
1950s American anthology television series
1950s American drama television series
American live television series
Black-and-white American television shows
English-language television shows
NBC original programming